In medicine, the poppy seed test is a diagnostic test used before surgery to predict if surgery will find a vesicointestinal fistula or colovesical fistula (an abnormal direct pathway between the colon and urinary bladder) or other type of vesicointestinal fistula.


Method
The test is very simple. The patient is fed 1.25 ounces of poppy seeds with 12 ounces of fluid or 6 ounces of yogurt. The patient's urine is then collected for the next 48 hours and examined for poppy seeds. If a poppy seed is found in the urine, the patient has a colovesical or related fistula.

The test is very accurate.  In a series of 49 patients who underwent surgery for colovesical fistula due to sigmoid diverticulitis, the poppy seed test gave a correct diagnosis more often than abdominopelvic computerized tomography, magnetic resonance tomography of the abdomen, cystogram, retrograde colonic enema, urethrocystoscopy, and colonoscopy.  In a series of 20 patients in the United States, the poppy seed test was significantly more accurate than computed tomography.  In these two series, respectively, sensitivity of the test was 94.6% and 100%.  Because of the physical nature of the test,  specificity of the test is necessarily 100%.

The test is very inexpensive.  In the United States it has been reported to cost under 6 dollars and two orders of magnitude less than computed tomography.

The test was first described in the English medical literature in 2001, by a group of urologists in Germany.  From 1994 to 1999, they gave  of poppy seeds to a series of 17 patients, then examined the patients' urine for two days.  The test results were correct for all patients:  11 patients with fistulas did pass poppy seeds in their urine and 6 patients without fistulas did not pass poppy seeds.

References

Poppy seeds
Medical tests
Diagnostic gastroenterology
Symptoms and signs: Urinary system